C15orf39 is a protein that in humans is encoded by the Chromosome 15 open reading frame 15 (C15orf39) gene.

Gene

Location
C15orf39 is located on chromosome 15 (15q24.2), spanning 16.53kb from 75487985 to 75504515 on the plus DNA strand. C15orf39 has three exons, and seven introns.

mRNA

Isoforms 
The coding sequence for the C15orf39 mRNA is 4443 base pairs long. The C15orf39 gene produces seven mRNA transcripts, with the longest coding isoform being 1047 amino acids long, and the shortest being 27 amino acids which has a truncated 3' end.

Expression 
C15orf39 is highly expressed in the trigeminal ganglion, superior cervical ganglion, whole blood, and the heart. Low expression levels of C15orf39 were found in the occipital lobe and PB-CD19+ B-cells.

.

.

C15orf39 expression levels in fetal and adult reticulocytes showed significantly different levels of expression (P < 0.0001), with adult reticulocytes expressing more C15orf39 than fetal cells.

.

.

.

.

Protein

General Properties
C15orf39 has an unmodified molecular mass of 110.6 kDA. The modified molecular mass is 110.7 kDA. C15orf39 is composed of an above average level of proline (≈17%), and is deficient in isoleucine (≈1%) and asparagine (≈1%). Both close (Thirteen-lined ground squirrel) and distant (Crested-Ibis) orthologs contained above average levels of proline, and low levels of isoleucine, and asparagine.

Domains and Motifs
C15orf39 has four predicted domains. Two of which, are the proline rich and alanine rich domains. The large tegument protein UL36 domain is important in the regulation of the viral cycle of Human Herpes Virus 1 (HHV-1), including transporting the viral capsid to the nuclear pore complex, and linking the inner and outer viral tegument capsids together. Lastly, the WH2 domain, WASP-homology domain 2, is approximately 18 amino acids long, and serves as an actin binding domain. WH2 binds actin monomers enabling the production of actin filaments.

Post-Translational Modifications 
The predicted post-translational modifications for C15orf39 include phosphorylation, acetylation, sumoylation, and o-glycosylation. An amino acid of importance is K17, which has an acetyl and sumo-group covalently attached. Also, T970, which is phosphorylated and has an o-glycosyl group attached. All predicted post-translational modifications were conserved in distant and strict orthologs.

.

.

.

.

.

Structure 
Alpha helices predicted in the C15orf39 protein are colored red, and random coils are represented as tan. No beta sheets were predicted to be part of the secondary structure for C15orf39. The amino acids not modeled were predicted to be random coils.

Sub-cellular Localization 
C15orf39 is predicted to be located in the cytosol of the cell.

Protein Interactions
Protein interaction screenings have showed C15orf39 to interact with many proteins, including RPLP1 and EIF4ENIF1. C15orf39 was discovered to interact with RPLP1 (Large Ribosomal Subunit Protein P1), a cytoplasmic protein, in a high-output yeast two-hybrid screening. RPLP1 is an acidic ribosomal subunit that is important in the elongation step of transcription. EIF4ENIF1 (Eukaryotic Translation Initiation Factor 4E Transporter), is a nucleocytoplasmic protein that shuttles the translation initiation factor eIF4E between the nucleus and cytoplasm. The protein interaction between C15orf39 and EIF4ENIF1 was discovered through affinity capture.

Homology

Paralogs
There are no known paralogs for the human C15orf39 gene.

Orthologs
The ortholog space for C15orf39 includes relatives as distant as the cartilaginous fish like Rhincodon typus (whale shark), and as strict as closely related mammals like the Gorilla, which has 99% sequence identity to the human protein. The phylogenetic tree below, shows the evolutionary relationship of the C15orf39 protein sequence in its orthologs.

Divergence 

The graph displays that the C15orf39 protein is quickly evolving. C15orf39's sequence has diverged at a quicker rate than the quickly evolving fibrinogen protein in humans.

.

.

.

.

.

.

.

.References 

Genes